Rev. James Davies, born James Banks, (20 May 1820 – 11 March 1883) was an English classical scholar, writer,  headmaster, landowner, and prebendary of the Church of England.

Biography
James Banks was born in Herefordshire. He matriculated at St Mary Hall, Oxford, in October 1841 and became a scholar of Lincoln College, Oxford, graduating there B.A. 1844, M.A. 1846. He was ordained in 1845. He was for some years headmaster of King Edward's School, Ludlow, and perpetual curate of Christ Church, Forest of Dean. In 1858 by royal license he assumed the surname of Davies in lieu of Banks, due to coming into possession of some property near Kington, Herefordshire.

He married in 1847; the marriage produced many children. His estate was an inheritance from his great-uncle James Davies, DL.

Selected publications

Essays

Books

 (translated into English verse from the text of Sir George Cornewall Lewis)

References

External links

1820 births
1883 deaths
Alumni of Lincoln College, Oxford
English classical scholars
19th-century English Anglican priests